A Caddy for Daddy is an album by jazz saxophonist Hank Mobley recorded on December 18, 1965, and released on the Blue Note label in 1967. It features performances by Mobley with trumpeter Lee Morgan, trombonist Curtis Fuller, pianist McCoy Tyner, bassist Bob Cranshaw and drummer Billy Higgins.

Reception
The AllMusic review by Scott Yanow awarded the album 4½ stars stating "For this CD, which is a straight reissue of a 1965 session, Mobley is joined by trumpeter Lee Morgan, trombonist Curtis Fuller, pianist McCoy Tyner, bassist Bob Cranshaw, and drummer Billy Higgins (a typically remarkable Blue Note lineup) for the infectious title cut, three other lesser-known but superior originals, plus Wayne Shorter's "Venus Di Mildew." Recommended.".

Track listing

Personnel 
 Hank Mobley — tenor saxophone
 Curtis Fuller — trombone
 Lee Morgan — trumpet
 McCoy Tyner — piano
 Bob Cranshaw — bass
 Billy Higgins — drums

References 

1967 albums
Albums produced by Alfred Lion
Blue Note Records albums
Hank Mobley albums
Albums recorded at Van Gelder Studio